Maria Panagiotou (born 5 February 2005) is a Cypriot footballer who plays as a midfielder for Cypriot First Division club Apollon Ladies FC and the Cyprus women's national team.

Club career
Panagiotou has played for Apollon Ladies in Cyprus.

International career
Panagiotou capped for Cyprus at senior level during the 2023 FIFA Women's World Cup qualification.

References

2005 births
Living people
Cypriot women's footballers
Women's association football midfielders
Apollon Ladies F.C. players
Cyprus women's international footballers